Uu... Kodathara? Ulikki Padathara? (alternative spelling: Oo Kodathara? Ulikki Padathara?), commonly referred to as UKUP, is a 2012 Indian Telugu-language fantasy action comedy film produced by Lakshmi Manchu and directed by Sekhar Raja. The film stars Nandamuri Balakrishna, Manoj Manchu, Deeksha Seth, Lakshmi Manchu and Sonu Sood, with music composed by VidyaSagar, Bobo Shashi along with Chinna's background score. Cinematography is handled by B. Rajasekar. The soundtrack of the film was launched on 30 May 2012. The film was released worldwide on 27 July 2012.

Plot
The film begins in a heritage palace Gandharva Mahal belongs to the royal dynasty Rudramaneni for centuries. As of today, Rayudu is its heir who has lost his splendor and resides in the outhouse with his wife and two daughters Visalakshi & Jagadhamba. He allows the palace in different portions for people of various mindsets on rent to make ends meet. In which some willies misuse the generosity of Rayudu and power over him. At that point, Manoj an energetic guy lands on the premises and joins as a tenant where he spots old insane beggar Amurtha Valli wandering in the surroundings. Currently, he terror-stricken the sly with a fake horror play and aligns them. Meanwhile, Rayudu fixes a fine alliance for Visalakshi and decides to bestow the palace as a dowry. Plus, he requests the tenants to vacate which they deny but Manoj tactically restores it. Parallelly, he always squabbles with Jagadhamba, and in time, they crush. Suddenly, one night, aghast Manoj grounds Rayudu with a bloodied nose and claims that a supernatural power batter and warns him never letting the palace. Then Rayudu states it may be his father Rudramaneni Narsimha Rayudu and spins rearward.

A long time ago, Rudramaneni Narsimha Rayudu is an arbiter who is esteemed as a deity. In his reign, that terrain is eternal from four sides. He adores the Gandharva Mahal and dotes on his sibling Jagadhamba. Based on his father’s promise, Narsimha Rayudu knits Jagadhamba with malice Phanindra Bhupati being unbeknownst. Soon after, Bhupati ruses, by discomfit himself as down and out. Annoyed Narsimha Rayudu gives half of what he owns including the Gandharva Mahal to his sister and walks out of the house. He also gifts a one-fourth to his true blue Seshayya. Later, it turns out Bhupati lusts on his sweetheart Amrutha whom he aspires to be his spouse. However, she refuses it as Bhupati is already in wedlock. Therefore, the vicious Bhupati slays Jagadhamba and makes it a suicide. Only a week after, he attempts to splice Amurtha in the Gandharva Mahal. Being cognizant of it, Narasimha Rayudu flares up on Bhupati when Seshayya dies in combat. Moreover, Narasimha Rayudu is backstabbed when he slaughters Bhupati. Before leaving his breath, Narasimha Rayudu warns Gandharva Mahal belongs to him and nobody can dare to touch it. Devastated Amrutha, blames herself for the deed and transformed into a beggar.

Presently, the wedding arrangements of Visalakshi are in progress at the palace under the charge of Manoj. Rushi the bridegroom arrives with his family. Whereat, Bujji his maternal uncle is a duplicitous ploy to squat the palace to convert it into a hotel and nabs the documents. The following night, he has thumped by Narasimha Rayudu's soul and spooked. So, Rushi’s mother decides to cancel the nuptials when Manoj coaxes them and retrieves the documents. Despite this, Bujji gives a call to a Wizard who senses the existence of Narasimha Rayudu & Bhupati therein. According to Narasimha Rayudu's guidance, the Wizard captures the violent soul of Bhupati. In the interim, Rayudu learns about the love affair of Manoj & Jagadhamba when he invites his parents. Surprisingly, Manoj is the grandson of Seshayya that has sent by his mother Suguna to aid Rayudu.

Forthwith, Manoj reveals to Jagadhamba that the wallop of Narasimha Rayudu’s soul on him & Bujji is part of his play to safeguard the palace. Anyhow, at once he is under dichotomy for words and doings of the wizard. Overhearing it, enraged Bujji knocks out Manoj, and assuming Wizard is also an impostor he breaks the bottle containing Bhupati’s soul. Now the unfettered spirit of Bhupati enters Rishi's body and creates mayhem. Hence, to impede him Narasimha Rayudu catches hold of Manoj’s body when a deadly battle erupts. Immediately, the Wizard rushes to Amurtha to solve the problem and avoid the imminent. Thus, Amurtha sacrifices her life to relieve Bhupati’s soul. At last, Manoj & Jagadhamba and Rushi & Visalakshi's marriages occur. Finally, the movie ends with Manoj viewing Narasimha Rayudu sitting on a chair and smoking a cigar, indicating that he would forever protect the Gandharva Mahal.

Cast

Soundtrack

The soundtrack of the film was composed by Bobo Shashi, which happens to be his second Manoj Manchu project after Bindaas. One of the songs on the album was composed by popular Indian composer Vidyasagar. Initially, the audio launch event was planned to be held on 18 May 2012 in Guntur. But it was postponed due to unknown reasons. The soundtrack album was released on 30 May 2012 under Aditya Music label at Shilpakala Vedika in Hyderabad. All songs in the album were penned by R. Ramu and the background score of the film was given by Chinna.

Production
Manoj Manchu was quoted many times stating that UKUP was his dream project. The movie will be shot simultaneously in Telugu and Tamil. Director Shekar Raja worked as an assistant to director Krishna Vamsi. Although planned three years ago, the movie entered pre-production in early 2011. Lakshmi Manchu, along with Manoj, established Manchu Entertainments banner to produce this movie.

Balakrishna Nandamuri was approached for an important role in the movie, which he agreed to do. Dialogues in the movie are penned by Lakshmi Bhupal (of Ala Modalaindi fame) and cinematography will be handled by B. Rajashekar. Rajashekar is also working with Manoj on his other movie Mr. Nokia. On 6 June 2011 the film was officially announced. The regular filming began on 2 August 2011 with Veronica Manchu switching on the camera while Manchu Lakshmi's husband Anand gave the clap for the first shot and Mohan Babu directed the first shot. The entire shoot of the film would be wrapped up in a single schedule. Initial schedule of it was completed in Manikonda by 16 August 2011. It was announced that Balakrishna would be playing the role of Zamindar Narsimha Rayudu, and he joined the filming in Antarvedi along with Sonu Sood and Bhanu Chander. Lakshmi Manchu has announced that a huge Gandharva Mahal set was built with a budget more than 6.5 crores and more than 50% of the shoot would be done in it. Tamil version of the movie was officially launched on 15 December 2011 in Chennai. By end of February 2012, almost 80% of the total filming was completed and filming of the climax will begin at Hyderabad in March 2012. An event took place on 12 May 2012 at the Gandarva Mahal set, where Dasari Narayana Rao, K. Raghavendra Rao and Vara Prasad launched the logo and released the posters of the film. Uu Kodathara? Ulikki Padatara? was released on 27 July 2012 in more than 60 theatres in Hyderabad alone.

The logo and posters of Varuvan Thalaivan, the predominantly dubbed Tamil version of the film, was launched in Chennai by Tamil actor Silambarasan on 21 May 2012. The team re-shot certain scenes with actors Pandiarajan, Charle and Manobala for the Tamil audiences. However the Telugu version's poor performance at the box office meant that the Tamil version was not released.

Release

Critical reception
The film opened to mixed to negative reviews but balakakrishna's performance was praised by critics. Jeevi from Idlebrain gave 3.25 of 5.0 rating and said "UKUP is a special film for two reasons. One is that it introduces a big star like Bala Krishna in a vital role. If big stars accept story oriented films and act as per demand of the role instead of looking for equal screen space, it’s good for the industry. The second reason is that the producer has passionately invested on the project though it’s a story oriented film with a bit of experimentation. Watch it for the performances of Bala Krishna Nandamuri, Manoj Manchu and Lakshmi Manchu. And for the spectacular Gandharva Mahal set". Mahesh Koneru from 123Telugu gave 3.0 of 5.0 rating and said "Balakrishna’s majestic performance is the biggest attraction for UKUP. Though the film has been made with rich production values and has a superb last 25 minutes, a below par first half and unconventionally shot songs work against the film." Karthik Pasupulate from The Times of India gave 2.5 stars and said "Vu Kodathara Vulikki Padathara is one of those films that tries hard push the envelope, but succeeds only in parts. It does offer some moments though, better execution could have raised the movie experience by a fair few notches. "

References

External links

2012 films
Films scored by Vidyasagar
Indian horror films
2012 horror films
2010s Telugu-language films